The Social Democratic Party of Albania (PSD or PSDSH) is a minor social-democratic political party in Albania. Its founder is Skënder Gjinushi, a former Minister of Education (1987–1991) and Speaker of Parliament (1997–2001).

History
The party was formed in March 1991, and was admitted into the Socialist International at its XIX congress in 1992. The party contested the 1992 parliamentary elections, winning seven seats. It did not run in the 1996 elections, but returned to contest the elections the following year in an alliance with the Socialist Party, with the PSD winning nine seats.

In the 2001 elections the party was reduced to four seats. The 2005 elections saw the party increase its representation back to seven seats. For the 2009 elections it was part of the "Unification for Changes" alliance, but received just 1.8% of the national vote and lost all its seats. In the 2017 elections the Social Democratic Party won one seat. The 2021 elections saw the party win three seats.

The party was delisted from the Socialist International in 2014.

Election results

Parliament

References

1991 establishments in Albania
Former member parties of the Socialist International
Political parties established in 1991
Political parties in Albania
Social democratic parties in Albania